Malawati Stadium is an indoor stadium located in Shah Alam, Selangor, Malaysia.The stadium is located beside the Shah Alam Stadium. The stadium has a maximum seated capacity of 13,000 and is capable of housing different events including sports events, warehouse sales, concerts, exhibitions and talks in its fully air conditioned 50 × 50 meters square arena.

History 
On 12 May 1998, the stadium was officially opened by Sultan Salahuddin of Selangor. On 1 January 2001, the Shah Alam City Council began taking charge of the maintenance of the stadium. On 1 April 2005, the stadium's management responsibility was fully transferred to the Shah Alam City Council.

Notable events

Sport events
World Table Tennis Championship (2016)
Malaysia Open Badminton Championship (2016)
2021–22 Malaysia Purple League group stage (2022)

Entertainment events
Major All Stars Season 1
Konsert Jelajah M. Nasir (2015)
 Russell Peters - Almost Famous World Tour (2015)
 The Script - No Sound Without Silence Tour (2015)
 A-Lin Sonar World Tour Live in Malaysia (2015)
Selena Gomez - Revival Tour (2016)
Journey - Eclipse Tour (2017)
Imagine Dragons - Evolve World Tour (2018)
Charlie Puth - Voicenotes Tour (2018) 
iKon - iKon 2018 Continue Tour (2018)
Winner - Winner 2018 Everywhere Tour
Dewa 19 - Dewa 19 Reunion Live In Malaysia (2019)
Blackpink - In Your Area World Tour (2019)
Boyzone - Thank You & Goodnight Tour (2019)
Monsta X - We Are Here World Tour (2019)
GFriend - Go Go GFriend! Tour (2019)
Kim Jae-hwan - 2019 Kim Jae-hwan Fanmeeting [MIN:D] (2019)
Westlife - The Twenty Tour (2019)
NU'EST - 2019 NU'EST Concert 'Segno' (2019)
Super Junior-D&E - The D&E (2019)
Khalid - Free Spirit Asia Tour (2020)
MAMAMOO - MY CON World Tour (2023)
 Treasure -  Treasure Tour Hello  (2023)

Notable tournaments 
 1998 Sukma Games
 1998 Commonwealth Games
 2017 SEA Games

Transportation
The stadium is connected to  LRT Kelana Jaya line via  Glenmarie LRT station by RapidKL feeder bus T774 LRT Glenmarie ↺ Stadium Shah Alam as well as  KTM Port Klang line via  Batu Tiga Komuter station by SmartSelangor bus SA02 MBSA / Hentian Bandar Shah Alam ↺ KTM Batu Tiga via Stadium Shah Alam. 

The stadium will be connected to  LRT Shah Alam line by  Stadium Shah Alam LRT station once the line starts operating in 2024.

References

Sports venues in Selangor
Indoor arenas in Malaysia
1998 establishments in Malaysia
Badminton venues in Malaysia
Boxing venues in Malaysia
Music venues in Malaysia